
PVP  may refer to:

Media and culture 
 Player versus player (PvP), a type of combat in multiplayer video games
 PrankvsPrank, a YouTube channel
 PvP, a webcomic
 PVP Live, an Esports news and statistics database website
 Pony VS Pony, a web-based Flash game developed by Artix Entertainment
 PVP (band) :es:PVP (banda), a Spanish punk band

Medicine 
 Post-vasectomy pain syndrome, a chronic pain condition 
 Povidone Iodine Prep, an iodine antiseptic
 alpha-PVP, also called flakka, the drug alpha-Pyrrolidinopentiophenone
 Photoselective vaporization of the prostate, a surgical treatment for an enlarged prostate

Military 
 Petit Véhicule Protégé, a French light armoured vehicle

Science and technology 
 PVP-OPM (Protected Video Path – Output Protection Management), a form of digital rights management
 Poly-4-vinylphenol, a plastic similar to polystyrene
 Polyvinylpyrrolidone, a water-soluble polymer

Companies 
 PVP Karting, a Danish manufacturer of racing Superkarts

Other 
 Plant Variety Protection, a special form of intellectual property
 P v P, a New Zealand court case regarding promissory estoppel
 Palos Verdes Peninsula, a peninsula in Southern California
 Parti des Verts pour le Progrès, a Tunisian political party